Russell Gerry Crook (1869–1955) was an American sculptor and craftsman active in the Boston area.

Crook was born in Lincoln, Massachusetts, and studied under John Henry Twachtman and Augustus Saint-Gaudens. He created the Kona Fountain in Center Harbor, New Hampshire (1907), as well as figureheads for Dodge Watercars and a pair of terracotta polar bears.

References 
 
 AskArt description
 Invaluable.com auction description
 Dodge Watercars

1869 births
1955 deaths
19th-century American sculptors
19th-century American male artists
American male sculptors
20th-century American sculptors
People from Lincoln, Massachusetts
Sculptors from Massachusetts
20th-century American male artists